Chef America Inc. was the manufacturer of the microwavable snack Hot Pockets. 

Chef America is a former closely held corporation, which was formed in the late 1970s by two brothers, Paul and David Merage, of Colorado. 

Nestlé acquired the corporation in 2002 for $2.6 billion. Hot Pockets continued to be manufactured in Englewood, Colorado, Chef America's former headquarters, until 2013, when the corporate headquarters was merged with Nestlé's frozen food corporate office in Solon, Ohio.  As of 2016, all Hot Pockets were produced in Mount Sterling, Kentucky.

References

Food manufacturers of the United States
Companies based in Englewood, Colorado
Companies established in the 1970s
Food and drink companies disestablished in 2002
2002 mergers and acquisitions
Nestlé